Ciarán Foy (born 1979) is an Irish film director and screenwriter, best known for directing and writing Citadel and directing Sinister 2.

Early life 
Foy was born in Northside Dublin in October 1979 and graduated from the National Film School.

Career 
In 2006, Foy directed an award-winning short film The Faeries of Blackheath Woods based on his own script.

In 2012, Foy wrote and directed his feature film debut, an Irish psychological horror Citadel, starring Aneurin Barnard in the lead role. The film premiered at the South by Southwest festival on 11 March 2012 and won several awards.

Foy next directed the supernatural horror film Sinister 2 for Blumhouse Productions, starring James Ransone and Shannyn Sossamon. The film was written by Scott Derrickson and C. Robert Cargill, and was released on 21 August 2015 by Focus Features' label Gramercy Pictures. Derrickson secured Foy the directing job of the film after watching Citadel.

Foy is set to direct a 1960s Ireland-set elevated thriller film The Shee, produced by Blumhouse's Jason Blum, Alan Maher's Roads Entertainment and Foy's Shadow Aspect.

Filmography 
 2001: 1902 - Director, editor, producer, writer - Short film
 2001: Wired 03:36 - Director, editor, producer, writer - Short film
 2002: The Puppet - Director, editor, writer - Short film
 2006: The Faeries of Blackheath Woods - Director, editor, writer - Short film
 2007: Scumbot - Director, editor, writer - Short film
 2009: The Chronoscope - Editor - Short film
 2009: Hotel Darklight - Director, writer - Segment
 2012: Citadel - Director, writer
 2015: Sinister 2 - Director
 2019: Eli - Director
 2020: The Haunting of Bly Manor - Director (2 episodes)

References

External links 
 

Living people
Film people from Dublin (city)
Irish film directors
Irish women film directors
Irish screenwriters
Irish women screenwriters
Irish film editors
Irish women editors
Irish film producers
Irish women film producers
Horror film directors
Alumni of IADT
1979 births